Dikla Hadar (born December 10, 1981) is an Israeli actress and voice actress.

Biography
Born in Ashkelon, Hadar began her career on stage in 2007. Prior to that, she completed her studies at Thelma Yellin High School and was also a maintenance officer at Logistics Corps. As for Hadar's stage career, she has performed in cabaret shows in the Cameri Theatre and many other theatres across Israel. Many of these shows were directed by Gilad Kimchi. In 2009, she performed in a stage adaption of A Midsummer Night's Dream.

On screen, Hadar made her most earliest television appearance in 2011 but she is more known to the Israeli public as a voice actress. She performed the Hebrew voices of Viper in the Kung Fu Panda franchise, Rachel in Yogi Bear, Sam Sparks in Cloudy with a Chance of Meatballs, Elastigirl in Incredibles 2, Susan Murphy in Monsters vs. Aliens, Holley Shiftwell in Cars 2, Joy in Inside Out, Rosita in Sing and she also voiced Princess Fiona in the Hebrew dub of Shrek Forever After, replacing Sharona Nestovich,  Avatar Korra in The Legend of Korra, Pam-I-Am in Green Eggs and Ham, Shizu in Samurai Rabbit: The Usagi Chronicles and Trudy Proud in The Proud Family: Louder and Prouder.

Personal life
Hadar is in a same-sex relationship and together, she and her partner have a child born via sperm donation.

References

External links

1981 births
Living people
Beit Zvi School for the Performing Arts alumni
Israeli film actresses
Israeli stage actresses
Israeli television actresses
Israeli voice actresses
Israeli lesbian actresses
People from Ashkelon
Thelma Yellin High School of Arts alumni
21st-century Israeli actresses
21st-century Israeli LGBT people